Operative Masonry or The Worshipful Society of Free Masons, Rough Masons, Wallers, Slaters, Paviors, Plaisterers and Bricklayers or simply The Operatives is a fraternal guild claiming a history of hundreds of years over which customs, traditions, knowledge and practices were developed and handed down.

History
The guild arose from the practice of masons over several centuries with traditions and practices passed down.  The guild was severely impacted by the United Kingdom Trade Union Act 1871 causing resulting in unions to an extent superseding the operative guild.

By the early 1900s two people in particular, Clement E. Stretton of Leicester and John Yanker of Manchester took the cause of reviving the guild and ensuring practices did not become extinct.

Stretton lived long enough to pass information to John Carr and a Lodge was formed in London in the mid 1910s enabling the traditions of the guild to be preserved.

Operative assemblies have since been formed in several countries.

Further reading

References

Footnotes

Sources

External links
 

Secret societies